Old Xaverians may refer to:
Old Xaverians Football Club, an Australian rules football club based in Armadale, Victoria
Old Xaverians SC, an Association football (soccer) club based in Kew East, Victoria